Sultanköy is a village in the Artuklu District of Mardin Province in Turkey. The village is populated by Kurds of the Surgucu tribe and had a population of 378 in 2021.

References 

Villages in Artuklu District
Kurdish settlements in Mardin Province